The Reserve Command (RESCOM) is a major support command of the Philippine Army. It was created for the sole purpose of reserve force management, organization and Government Arsenal procurement.

History

Philippine Commonwealth
By 1935, the Philippine Commonwealth, under the leadership of President Manuel Luis Quezon enacted the very first legislature of his government. Commonwealth Act Nr. 01 ensured that Philippines will be prepared to thwart off any invasion or aggression of some sort by any nation, or entity and thus called upon its citizens to provide manpower to then fledgling Philippine Army. The National Defense Act of 1935 heralded the creation of what would be the Armed Forces of the Philippines and very first documented account of voluntary citizen enlistment.

World War II

Reservists fought hard during the 1940s and saw action on almost all parts of the country in World War II. Regular and reserve members of then Philippine Army/Philippine Army Air Corps (forerunner of the Phil Air Force), the Philippine Constabulary, and the Philippine Offshore Patrol (what would become the Phil Navy later on.) were incorporated with US units and rallied under the banner of the USAFFE.

A ragtag group of former ROTC Cadets, Guerilla Fighters and draftees of the Philippine Army Reserve Force formed units among themselves and fought gallantly against the Japanese invaders. Collectively, they were known as the Hunters ROTC Unit.

Post World War II
Post WWII saw the re-organization of the AFP and the further need to rebuild the defense of the nation. Reserve units were then organized to Battalion Combat Teams with the sole purpose of force augmentation in the eventuality that another world war ensues.

On September 1, 1977, the Army Reserve Command was activated pursuant to General Orders No. 250 of the Philippine Army. Army officers were tasked to organized, train, and manage a reserve force that will equate or surpass the current strength of its regular forces.

1986 EDSA Revolution
By 1986, after the EDSA Revolution, the unit was shortly deactivated since the AFP at that time was undergoing retraining and re-organization.

Birth of the modern reserve force
1991 saw the birth of a new reserve force when Republic Act 7077 (Reservists Act of 1991) was signed into law on July 1, 1991. This new legislation directed the AFP to organize and create units with the sole purpose of reservists management.

On May 12, 1992, the Reserve Command, Philippine Army, was again reactivated pursuant to HPA General Orders No. 392 and was later again renamed as the Army Reserve Command on October 1, 1999 (HPA GO Nr 1300) and was given its marching orders to maintain, administer, develop, train, and organize reservists units to help enhance and sustain National Security and Development.

Future of the reserve force
In the 21st century, the unit is modernizing itself pursuant to the directives of Headquarters, Philippine Army's transformation roadmap to 2028.

Legal mandate

Commonwealth Act 1

Commonwealth Act No. 1, particularly Section II, cites the responsibility of each and every citizen of for the defense of the nation. Citizens may be mobilized in the event the national government declares an act of war or emergency.

Republic Act 7077
Republic Act No. 7077, also known as the Citizen's Armed Force Act or Reservist Law of 1991, is an act passed in to law by the joint house of representatives which clearly provides the policies and procedures in the creation and administration of reservists and reserve units of the Armed Forces of the Philippines.

Republic Act 9163

Republic Act No. 9163, also known as the National Service Training Program Act or National Service Law of 2001, defines the policies and procedures in administration/training of ROTC Units in relation to the other two components, Civic Welfare Training Service (CWTS) and Literacy Training Service (LTS), of the National Service Training Program (NSTP).

Role of women in the reserve force

Section 65, Article X, of RA 7077 clearly defines the right and duty of every able bodied female citizen of the Republic of the Philippines to serve in the Armed Forces of the Philippines. Standards for acceptance of female reservists shall likewise be kept standard like their male counterparts with a few adjustments due to physiological differences with the latter.

Commissioned officers
  COL SARA ZIMMERMAN DUTERTE-CARPIO GSC (RES) PA - current Vice President of the Republic of the Philippines 
  COL MARGARITA R COJUANGO MNSA (RES) PA - former Governor; Tarlac, former President; Philippine Public Safety College (PPSC)
  COL ENRICO T YUZON GSC (RES) PA - Bataan Provincial Engineer
  LTC MARLENE RUTH S SANCHEZ MNSA (RES) PA - Deputy Executive Director; NCCA
  LTC MARLENE AGABAS (RES) PA - Pangasinan 3rd District Representative
  LTC MARY RUBY M PALMA (RES) PA - Department Head; Quezon City Gender and Development Resource and Coordinating Office
  LTC REMELYN RECOTER (RES) PA - Regional Director, Department of Agriculture Regional Office 6
  LTC GWENDOLYN P GARCIA (RES) PA - Former Cebu Governor
  LTC ROSALINDA D BALDOZ MNSA (RES) PA - DOLE Secretary

Non-commissioned officers
  MSg Jennivev S Tamayo (Res) PA - Actress; (ABS-CBN), former Corps Commander of UE ROTC Unit Class of 2002.
  MSg Maria Lourdes Carlos-Fernando (Res) PA - former mayor, Marikina
  MSg Olivia P Antonio (Res) PA - first female army reservist deployed with the UN Peacekeeping Force
  MSg Maria Regina Corazon Weigh Donaleigh Sevilla-Sibal (Res) PA - first female Corps Commander of UP ROTC Unit Class of 2000.

Training
Training is the major task handled by RESCOM. Its primary arms are the university/college-based Department of Military Science and Tactics-administered mandatory basic and the optional advanced Reserve Officer Training Corps (ROTC); and the territorial unit-administered Basic Citizen's Military Training (BCMT).

Reserve Officer's Training Corps (ROTC)

Basic ROTC is the only component required by a tertiary (college) level student to have completed as requirement for completion of the National Service Training Program. Military subjects are provided similar to how military instructions are conducted in the service academies and graduates are automatically enlisted in the reserve force of the particular service branch (Army) administering the training. Advance ROTC is purely voluntary in nature and that Advance ROTC Cadets are provided a modest allowance after passing the requirements for their respective Advance ROTC Examination (PAARE). Completion of Advance ROTC is considered a graduate qualification in Military Science, and such graduates who subsequently progress to the Probationary Officer Training Course (POTC) are commissioned as 2nd Lieutenants.

Other than time-in-grade and merit promotions, rank adjustments are authorised depending on civilian qualifications, as well as their reciprocity to the operating environment.

Basic Citizen's Military Training (BCMT)

Basic Citizen's Military Training (BCMT) is a military training course conducted by the Philippine Army through the Army Reserve Command. It is an entry level training course undertaken by Filipino Citizens wanting to enlist in the reserve force.

BCMT instruction is administered by a joint training pool of military instructors from both regular and reserve forces and is usually conducted inside any of the Philippine Army's training camps. Guest instructors are requested from other government agencies and non-government organizations (NGO) for specialized instructions.

Special Basic Citizen's Military Training (SBCMT) is a special course conducted by the Philippine Army in response to a request from a Local Government Unit (LGU). Funding is usually provided for by the requesting agency as compared to regular BCMT which receives funding from the Army.

Types of reservists
There are currently three types of reservists in the Armed Forces of the Philippines (AFP) Reserve Force:

Categorization of reservists and reserve units
Section 12, Article 5, of Republic Act 7077 breaks down and categorizes reservists and their units based on various criteria cited by this law.

 First Category Reservists - Able bodied reservists aged eighteen years of age up to thirty five years of age, inclusive.
 Second Category Reservists - Able bodied reservists aged thirty six years of age up to fifty one years of age, inclusive.
 Third Category Reservists - All able bodied reservists aged above fifty years of age.

Classification of reservists and reserve units
Section 13, Article 5, of Republic Act 7077 clearly cites the classification of reservists based on their operational readiness for immediate deployment or mobilization.

 Ready Reserve - physically-fit and tactically-current reservist personnel that are always on constant alert and training; ready to mobilize once a mobilization order has been given.
 Standby Reserve - reservist personnel who do not maintain currency in specialization qualifications but the base for expansion, support and augmentation to the Ready Reserve Force as needed.
 Retired Reserve - composed of citizens who are qualified for retirement either by length of service or age.

Lineage of commanding officers
Commanders of RESCOM are drawn from both the ranks of Called To Active Duty (CAD) Reserve Officers and Regular Army Officers that graduated from either Officer Candidate School (OCS) and the Philippine Military Academy (PMA).
  Col Anthony Zamora  (GSC) PA Sep 1, 77 - 1986
  Col Ernesto H Luis MNSA (GSC) PA Jul 1, 92 - Jul 1, 95
  BGen Franklin C Acosta AFP Jul 1, 95 - Dec 10, 97
  BGen Antonio J Saldua AFP Dec 10, 97 - 30 Nov 00
  Col Edmund G Pacada (GSC) PA 30 Nov 00 - Jun 16, 2
  Col Bernard Basona (GSC) PA Jun 16, 2 - Apr 25, 2
  BGen Marcial A Collao Jr AFP Apr 25, 2 - Dec 9, 2
  BGen Edwin H Vargas AFP Dec 9, 2 - Oct 16, 3 
  BGen Dionisio A Torina AFP Oct 16, 3 - Jul 1, 4
  Col Ibarra P Gutierrez INF (GSC) PA Jul 1, 4 - Aug 24, 5 
  BGen Emmanuel S Cayton AFP Aug 24, 5 - Dec 18, 6
  BGen Luini C Mirar AFP Dec 18, 6 - May 26, 8
  BGen Danilo M Garcia AFP May 26 March 8 - 7, 2010
  BGen Joel P Ibañez AFP March 7, 2010 - March 10, 2011
  BGen Alex N Albano AFP March 10, 2011 – October 19, 2013
  BGen Alexis D Tamondong AFP October 19, 2013 -Nov 13, 2014
  BGen Paolo Leo Ma G Miciano AFP November 13, 2014, to February 2, 2016
  BGen Pascual Luis D Bedia AFP February 2, 2016 - September 16, 2016
  MGen Bernie S Langub PA September 16, 2016 - March 26, 2020
  MGen Peale Jon L Bondoc PA March 26, 2020, to July 10, 2021

Organization

RESCOM's unit are divided into several base units, regionally into 15 Community Defense Groups, having three or more Community Defense Centers incorporated into them, and nine Reserve Infantry Divisions. Army ROTC Management falls under their respective RCDGs.

Base units
 Headquarters & Headquarters Service Battalion
 ARESCOM Training School
 ARESCOM Reservist Personnel Management Center (Provisional)

Line units
 1st Regional Community Defense Group (Camp Lt Tito B Abat, Manaoag, Pangasinan)
 2nd Regional Community Defense Group (Camp Melchor F Dela Cruz Annex, Soyung, Echague, Isabela)
 3rd Regional Community Defense Group (Camp Gen Servillano T Aquino, San Miguel, Tarlac City)
 4th Regional Community Defense Group (Camp Gen Macario Sakay, Los Baños, Laguna)
 5th Regional Community Defense Group (Camp Gen Simeón A Ola, Legazpi City, Albay)
 6th Regional Community Defense Group (Camp Gen Adriano Hernández, Dingle, Iloilo City)
 7th Regional Community Defense Group (Camp Lapu-lapu, Cebu City)
 8th Regional Community Defense Group (Camp Downes, Ormoc, Leyte)
 9th Regional Community Defense Group (Kuta Dao, Pagadian City, Zamboanga del Sur)
 10th Regional Community Defense Group (Camp Edilberto Evangelista, Patag, Cagayan de Oro City)
 11th Regional Community Defense Group (Camp San Gabriel, Mintal Tugbok District, Davao City)
 12th Regional Community Defense Group (Camp Siongco, Awang, DOS, Maguindanao)
 National Capital Region Regional Community Defense Group (Fort Andres Bonifacio, Metro Manila)
 14th [CAR] Regional Community Defense Group
 15th [CARAGA] Regional Community Defense Group (Camp Bancasi, Butuan)

Ready Reserve Infantry divisions
  2nd Infantry Division (Ready Reserve), PA (Lupi, Camarines Sur)
  4th Infantry Division (Ready Reserve), PA (Cp Camp Natividad, Malaybalay City, Bukidnon)
  5th Infantry Division (Ready Reserve), PA (Cp Elpidio Quirino, Bulag, Bantay, Ilocos Sur
  6th Infantry Division (Ready Reserve), PA (Cp BG Gonzalo H Siongco, Tacurong, Maguindanao)
  8th Infantry Division (Ready Reserve), PA (Cp Vicente Lukban, Catbalogan, Western Samar)
  10th Infantry Division (Ready Reserve), PA (Cp Bancasi, Libertad, Butuan, Agusan del Norte)
  12th Infantry Division (Ready Reserve), PA (Cp Juan Villamor, Bangued, Abra)
  15th Infantry Division (Ready Reserve), PA (Fort Andrés Bonifacio, Metro Manila)
  16th Infantry Division (Ready Reserve), PA (Cp Tito Abat, Manaoag, Pangasinan) 
  17th Infantry Division (Ready Reserve), PA (Cp Eldridge, Los Baños, Laguna)
  18th Infantry Division (Ready Reserve), PA (Cp Jizmondo, Libas, Banga, Aklan)
  19th Infantry Division (Ready Reserve), PA (Cp Lapu-lapu, Cebu City)
  22nd Infantry Division (Ready Reserve), PA (Quimpo Boulevard, Almendras Gym Davao City)

Ready Reserve Light Armor divisions
  Light Armor (Ready Reserve) Division, PA (Cp Riego De Dios, Tanza, Cavite)

Standby Reserve Infantry divisions
  11th Infantry (Standby Reserve) Division, PA (Cp Tito Abat, Manaoag, Pangasinan)
  21st Infantry (Standby Reserve) Division, PA (Cp Melchor Dela Cruz, Upi, Gamu, Isabela)
  31st Infantry (Standby Reserve) Division, PA (Cp Servillano Aquino, Luisita, Tarlac)
  41st Infantry (Standby Reserve) Division, PA (Cp Eldridge, Los Baños, Laguna)
  51st Infantry (Standby Reserve) Division, PA (Cp Simeon Ola, Legazpi City, Albay)
  61st Infantry (Standby Reserve) Division, PA (Cp Hernandez, Dingle, Iloilo)
  71st Infantry (Standby Reserve) Division, PA (Cp Lapu-lapu, Lahug, Cebu City)
  81st Infantry (Standby Reserve) Division, PA (Cp Downes, Ormoc City)
  91st Infantry (Standby Reserve) Division, PA (Cp Dau, Pagadian City)
  101st Infantry (Standby Reserve) Division, PA (Cp Evangelista, Cagayan de Oro City)
  111th Infantry (Standby Reserve) Division, PA (Cp San Gabriel, Davao City)
  121st Infantry (Standby Reserve) Division, PA (PC Hill, Cotabato City)
  131st Infantry (Standby Reserve) Division, PA (Fort Andrés Bonifacio, Metro Manila)
  141st Infantry (Standby Reserve) Division, PA (CARAGA Region)

Reserve regiments
  Artillery (Ready Reserve) Regiment, PA (Ft Andrés Bonifacio, Makati, Metro Manila)

Deactivated units
The Following Divisions were subsequently de-activated due to the activation of the two Regular Infantry Division with the laters divisional numerical designation.

  9th Infantry (Ready Reserve) Division, PA (Makati)
  3rd Infantry (Ready Reserve) Division, PA (Cebu City)

Reserve Brigade
  1502nd Infantry (Ready Reserve) Brigade, PA (Quezon City)

Awards and decorations

Campaign streamers

Badges

Gallery

See also
 Armed Forces of the Philippines Reserve Command
 Philippine Air Force Reserve Command
 Philippine Navy Reserve Command
 Home Defense Command
 Philippine Coast Guard Auxiliary

References

Bibliography

 Official Site ARESCOM
 The Training Committee, Military Science 21 ROTC Manual, 2001, NCRRCDG, ARESCOM.
 The Philippine Army Public Affairs Office, The Philippine Army: First 100 Years, 1997, OTAPA.
 Pobre, Cesar P. (2006). History of the Armed Forces of the Filipino People. New Day Publishers..

Commands of the Philippine Army
Military units and formations established in 1977